The Painter is a 2011 play by the British writer Rebecca Lenkiewicz on the life and relationships of J. M. W. Turner. It premiered at the Arcola Theatre in London in January 2011 to mark its move to new premises. The premiere cast included Toby Jones as Turner, Denise Gough as Turner's model Jenny Cole, Amanda Boxer as Turner's mother and Niamh Cusack as his mistress Sarah Danby.

References
Inline

Other

 

2011 plays
British plays
Plays based on real people
Biographical plays about painters
Cultural depictions of J. M. W. Turner